Roderick Lake may refer to:

 Roderick Lake (Manitoba-Saskatchewan)
 Roderick Lake (Muskoka District)